Helga Anna Augusta Ramstad (8 January 1875 – 20 March 1956) was a Norwegian politician, a member of the Labour Party.

The daughter of John Olsen Saastad, a farmer, and Charlotte Amalie Finckenhagen, she was born Helga Anna Augusta Saastad in Gullan, Hillestad, Vestfold.

From 1921 to 1941, she was custodian at a middle school in Teisen.

From 1916 to 1919, she was a member of the municipal executive council for Aker; from 1928 to 1931, she served on the municipal council for Aker. She represented Akershus in the Storting from 1934 to 1936. Ramstad was a member of the Labor Party's central committee from 1933 to 1936.

References 

1875 births
1956 deaths
Members of the Storting
Women members of the Storting
Labour Party (Norway) politicians
Politicians from Aker
People from Holmestrand